Pierre Marie Gabriel Vincent Ernest Leroy de Boiseaumarie (1890-1967), nicknamed Baron Le Roy, was a World War I fighter pilot credited with five aerial victories. 

He was the co-founder of the Institut National des Appellations d'Origine (INAO) and guided the creation of the Appellation d'origine contrôlée (AOC) system which is the basis of not only French wine laws but has also been influential in the laws and appellation systems across the globe.

Life

Pierre Leroy de Boiseaumarie (full name Pierre Marie Gabriel Vincent Ernest Leroy de Boiseaumarie) was born on 5 April 1890 in Mortagne-au-Perche, Orne, Normandy. 

His father was a cavalry officer who was decommissioned from the army for protesting again the law separating the church and the state. The family left their property in Mortagne-au-Perche and moved to Vendargues in the Hérault where they managed an estate producing  wine.
Le Roy studied law.
On 9 June 1907 during the revolt of the Languedoc winegrowers Le Roy set fire to the door of the courthouse of Montpellier to prevent the troops who had been confined inside from shooting at the demonstrators.

Pierre Leroy de Boiseaumarie began his mandatory military service on 10 October 1911. He began service as an infantryman, was transferred to artillery. On 21 February 1916, he began pilot training. He graduated with his Military Pilot's Brevet on 2 August 1916. After advanced training, he was posted to a fighter squadron, Escadrille N.78, on 19 February 1917. There he was promoted from the enlisted ranks to the rank of Sous lieutenant. While with this fighter squadron, he shot down two observation balloons and three enemy airplanes His fifth victory came on 7 June 1918; that same day, he was so seriously wounded that he had to be medically evacuated. On 17 August, he returned to his squadron; he was subsequently posted to Escadrille Spa.15. During the war, he was awarded the Médaille militaire, Croix de Guerre with three palmes, and the Légion d'honneur. 

In 1919 he married Edmée Bernard Le Saint, heiress of the Château Fortia, one of the most prestigious wine producing estates in the village of Châteauneuf-du-Pape in the Vaucluse department of southern France.
He became a prominent figure in not only the history of Châteauneuf-du-Pape but also in the history of French wine. In 1935 he and Joseph Capus co-founded the Institut National des Appellations d'Origine (INAO) and spearheaded the creation of the Appellation d'origine contrôlée (AOC) system that would become the basis of the French wine laws and continue to influence European wine laws into the twenty-first century.

He left a son and a daughter.  His Breton ancestor had been created a baron by Napoleon, though he had been a royalist, and was involved in the British embassy in Paris.

End notes

Sources

 

Information from his son and Barbara Whittingham-Jones, 'A Visit to Chateauneuf-du-Pape', Ridley's Wine & Spirit Trade Circular, 16 January 1952.

References

 Franks, Norman; Bailey, Frank (1993). Over the Front: The Complete Record of the Fighter Aces and Units of the United States and French Air Services, 1914–1918 London, UK: Grub Street Publishing. .

Further reading

1890 births
1967 deaths
French World War I flying aces